The Howson House is a historic house at 1700 South Olive Street in Pine Bluff, Arkansas.  It is a -story structure, faced in brick on the first floor and half-timbered stucco on the second.  A single-story porch extends across the main facade, supported by square brick piers, with exposed rafter ends in the shed roof.  The house was designed by the noted Arkansas firm of Thompson & Harding, and was built in 1918.

The house was listed on the National Register of Historic Places in 1982.

See also
National Register of Historic Places listings in Jefferson County, Arkansas

References

Houses completed in 1918
Houses in Pine Bluff, Arkansas
Houses on the National Register of Historic Places in Arkansas
National Register of Historic Places in Pine Bluff, Arkansas
Tudor Revival architecture in the United States